Sam Bradman (born May 26, 1990) is a professional lacrosse player on Team STX of the LXM Pro Tour.

Hailing from Canton, NY, Bradman was a four-year standout at Salisbury University in Maryland, where he stockpiled honors, including National Division III Player of the Year in 2012, en-route to becoming one of the most successful college lacrosse players in history. Bradman recently signed an endorsement deal with leading lacrosse manufacturer STX, upon the completion of his senior season, and now tours the country in a promotional capacity for the company between LXM events.

Bradman's career has been unpredictable from the outset, which has led to him being referred to as, "The Most Interesting Man in Lacrosse." Despite being recruited to play at the Division I level, Bradman opted to compete for the Seagulls of Division III powerhouse Salisbury University. He has been open in stating that he made the choice so as to be able to follow in his father's footsteps as a physical educator. Sam would continue his independent ways after his college career. Immediately after the 2012 National Championship, and despite being drafted by the Long Island Lizards of Major League Lacrosse, Bradman made waves by choosing to sign with the upstart LXM Pro Tour based in California.

NCAA Career  Stats

Professional indoor lacrosse
On October 12, 2012, Bradman made his professional box lacrosse debut with the Charlotte Copperheads of the Professional Lacrosse League, scoring three goals against the Reading Rockets in the Copperheads' 18-10 win.

Sam made his unofficial National Lacrosse League debut for the Minnesota Swarm on December 8, 2012. In a preseason exhibition against the Rochester Knighthawks, he posted two goals in an 11-10 loss.

U.S. men's national team

Bradman made his first official appearance with the U.S. Men's National Lacrosse Team during the Champions Challenge in Orlando, FL on January 26 and 27, 2013. After participating in a controlled scrimmage against Notre Dame on the 26th, Bradman led team USA to a 17-13 victory over NCAA defending National Champion Loyola on the 27th by scoring three goals and two assists (3-2-5), for which he was named MVP of the game. Team USA Head Coach Richie Meade was quoted as saying, "Sam had a chance to come out here and play, and he made the most of his opportunity. It's going to speak well for him moving forward," indicating Bradman would likely be back with the U.S. National Team in the future.

References

1990 births
Living people
American lacrosse players
Sportspeople from Philadelphia
Minnesota Swarm players
Georgia Swarm players